The Fourth Reich (El Cuatro Reich) is a 1990 South African biographical drama film directed by Manie van Rensburg and co-produced by Gert Basson, Mark Jaffee, David Selvan, Bill Shapter and Reg Wessels for Zastron Films. The film stars an ensemble South Africa cast, with Ryno Hattingh starring in the lead as Robey Leibbrandt. Supporting cast included Marius Weyers, Grethe Fox and Percy Sieff. Also supporting were many popular South African dramatists.

The film revolves around the life of Robey Leibbrandt, a South African boxer who participated in the 1936 Olympic Games in Berlin. While at the Games he was courted by the Nazis in an attempt to recruit him as an agent in South Africa. Leibbrandt embraced Nazi ideology, which culminated in his becoming an Abwehr agent for the Third Reich. As an Abwehr agent in 1939, Leibbrandt led an operation to overthrow the South African pro-Allied government, and to assassinate General Jan Smuts, at the time Prime Minister of the Union of South Africa.

The Fourth Reich was the most expensive film production in South African cinema history.

The Fourth Reich played well at international film festivals and received widespread acclaim and positive reviews.

Cast
 Ryno Hattingh as Robey Leibbrandt
 Marius Weyers as Jan Taillard
 Grethe Fox as Erna Dorfman
 Percy Sieff as Louis Esselen
 Elize Cawood as Romy Taillard
 Pierre Knoesen as Dice Lotter
 Ian Roberts as Johannes van der Walt
 Marcel van Heerden as Hendrik Erasmus
 Louis van Niekerk as General Smuts
 James Borthwick as Sidney Cohen
 Keith Grenville as Pierre van Ryneveld
 Sandra Kotzé as Mrs. Leibbrandt 
 Annabel Linder as Nadia Cohen
 Tertius Meintjes as Doors Erasmus
 Ernest Ndlovu as Sipho
 Eric Nobbs as Hennie Schoeman
 Brian O'Shaughnessy as Major Ellis
 Dan Robbertse as Kalie Theron 
 Cobus Rossouw as Dr. Hans van Rensburg
 Ron Smerczak as General Karlowa
 Carel Trichardt as Meyder Leibbrandt
 James White as Major Hattingh
 Christine Basson as Kiosk Lady
 Will Bernard as Barman
 Pieter Brand as Pat Jerling 
 Kerneels Coertzen as Van Rensburg burly
 Vanessa Cooke as Wanda Stander
 Michael Copley as Kruger
 Crispin De Nuys as Captain Nissen
 Gideon De Wet as Policeman
 Anton Dekker as Fourie
 Frantz Dobrowsky as Shelver
 Wilson Dunster as Charlie Vosloo
 Ernst Eloff as Beetge
 Annette Engelbrecht as Ouma Smuts
 Bill Flynn as Boxing Doctor
 Adrian Galley as Hansie
 Ben Kruger as Oosthuizen
 Greg Latter as Heckler
 Dale Lee as African Mirror
 Nico Liebenberg as Sgt Pauley
 Patrick Lyster as Sgt. Spengler
 Johan Niemandt as Wolmarans
 Deon Opperman as Van Rensburg burly
 Tjaart Potgieter as Lahousen
 Nicky Rebelo as Van Rensburg burly 
 André Rossouw as Dominee
 Robin Smith as Sgt Meintjes
 Wilna Snyman as Soprano
 Wilma Stockenström as Mrs. Engelbrecht
 André Stolz as Saunders
 Richard van der Westhuizen as Hirsh
 Jan van Deventer as Steyn
 Pierre van Pletzen as Hertzog
 Eric van Rensburg as Judge
 Herbie Vermuellen as Michelot 
 James Whyte as Snyman
 Andrew Worsdale as Joos Engelbrecht

References

External links
 

1990 films
1992 drama films
1992 films
South African drama films
English-language South African films
World War II spy films
1990s English-language films